tert-Amyl ethyl ether (TAEE) is a chemical compound, classified as an ether, with the molecular formula C7H16O.  It is used as an additive in gasoline fuels as an oxygenate and also as a solvent in organic chemistry. 

TAEE is prepared by acid-catalyzed addition of ethanol to 2-methyl-2-butene.

See also
List of gasoline additives

References

Ether solvents
Oxygenates